The following is an incomplete discography for Bud Spangler, a jazz percussionist, music producer, and radio personality from Detroit, Michigan, who later worked in Northern California. He got his start drumming and producing for labels such as Tribe Records and Strata Records in Detroit, and from 1989 to 1996 he was an engineer for the Maybeck Recital Hall in Berkeley, California, also producing a number of Grammy-nominated albums.

Discography

Production, instrumentals

Maybeck Recital Hall

References

External links

Discographies of American artists